Prasanth Kumar (born 13 December 1991) is an Indian cricketer who plays for Andhra Pradesh.

References

External links
 

1991 births
Living people
Indian cricketers
Andhra cricketers
People from Anantapur, Andhra Pradesh
Cricketers from Andhra Pradesh